Tonya Pfaff is an American politician. She has served as a Democratic member for the 43rd district of the Indiana House of Representatives.

In 2018, Pfaff won the election for the 43rd district of the Indiana House of Representatives. She succeeded another Democratic politician, Clyde Kersey. Pfaff assumed her office on November 7, 2018.

References 

Living people
Place of birth missing (living people)
Year of birth missing (living people)
Democratic Party members of the Indiana House of Representatives
21st-century American politicians
21st-century American women politicians
20th-century American women